Thierry Sabine (13 June 1949, Neuilly-sur-Seine – 14 January 1986, Mali) was a French wrangler, motorcycle racer and founder and main organizer of the Dakar Rally.

Career
In 1977 he got lost on the Tchigai Plateau, near the isolated mountain of Emi Fezzan during the Abidjan-Nice Race, and realized that the desert would be a good location for a rally where amateurs could test their ability. In December 1977 he established a race from Paris to Dakar and devoted the rest of his life to its organization. His motto for the Dakar Rally was, "A challenge for those who go. A dream for those who stay behind."

Sabine was noted for the care he took over the competitors, which was exemplified during the 1983 running of the event. That year, the route crossed the as-yet-unexplored Ténéré region of the Sahara and 40 competitors became lost when a sandstorm struck. He spent four days flying over the region and was able to direct all lost competitors toward the correct route. Nicole Maitrot, a competitor the previous year, said of him:
"One has the impression that Thierry Sabine is God looking over his sheep from up in his helicopter, coming down in a swirl of airplane to help those who are lost."

Sabine was killed when his Ecureuil helicopter crashed into a dune at Mali during a sudden sandstorm at 7:30 p.m. on Tuesday 14 January 1986. Also killed onboard was the singer-songwriter Daniel Balavoine, helicopter pilot François-Xavier Bagnoud, journalist Nathalie Odent and Jean-Paul Lefur who was a radiophonic engineer for RTL.  Sabine's ashes were later scattered at the Lost Tree in Niger, which the rally thereafter described as the "Arbre Thierry Sabine".

He was featured in the movie A Man and a Woman: 20 Years Later released in 1986.

Racing record

Complete 24 Hours of Le Mans results

Complete Tour de France Automobile results

References

1949 births
1986 deaths
Sportspeople from Neuilly-sur-Seine
French rally drivers
French motorsport people
Off-road racing drivers
Victims of helicopter accidents or incidents
Dakar Rally drivers
Dakar Rally 
Auto racing executives
Victims of aviation accidents or incidents in Mali
Victims of aviation accidents or incidents in 1986
Sport deaths in Mali
24 Hours of Le Mans drivers
Off-road motorcycle racers